Confess is an American drama television series, based on the novel of the same name by Colleen Hoover, that premiered on April 7, 2017, on Go90. Directed and written by Elissa Down, the series' seven-episode first season stars Katie Leclerc and Ryan Cooper and tells the story of a young woman with a difficult past who falls in love with a man who is keeping a secret from her.

References

External links

2010s American drama television series
2017 American television series debuts
English-language television shows